In mathematics, particularly, in analysis, Carleman's condition  gives a sufficient condition for the determinacy of the moment problem. That is, if a measure  satisfies Carleman's condition, there is no other measure  having the same moments as  The condition was discovered by Torsten Carleman in 1922.

Hamburger moment problem

For the Hamburger moment problem (the moment problem on the whole real line), the theorem states the following:

Let  be a measure on  such that all the moments

are finite. If

Stieltjes moment problem

For the Stieltjes moment problem, the sufficient condition for determinacy is

Notes

References

 

Mathematical analysis
Moment (mathematics)
Probability theory
Theorems in approximation theory